Bulbophyllum sect. Brachypus is a section of the genus Bulbophyllum.

Description
Species in this section is distinguished by its single flower on each inflorescence with 4 pollina

Distribution
Plants from this section are found from Papua New Guinea to New Caledonia, Borneo and Australia.

Species
Bulbophyllum section Brachypus comprises the following species:

References

Orchid subgenera